North Platte, Nebraska is a center of media in west-central Nebraska.  The following is a list of media outlets in the city.

Print

Newspapers
The North Platte Telegraph is the city's primary newspaper, published six days a week and owned by Lee Enterprises. In addition, Flatrock Publishing publishes a weekly alternative newspaper, the North Platte Bulletin.

Radio
The following is a list of radio stations licensed to and/or broadcasting from North Platte:

AM

FM

Television
North Platte is the principal city of the North Platte television market which includes three counties in west-central Nebraska:  Lincoln County, Logan County, and McPherson County.

The following is a list of television stations that broadcast from and/or are licensed to the city.

References

Mass media in Nebraska